Wilfred Norman Parsley (28 November 1923 – 1993), generally known as Norman but also as Wilf Parsley, was an English footballer who scored 14 goals from 161 appearances in the Football League playing as a wing half for Darlington.

References

1923 births
1993 deaths
People from Shildon
Footballers from County Durham
English footballers
Association football wing halves
Darlington F.C. players
English Football League players
Place of death missing